Oreisplanus munionga, the alpine sedge-skipper, is a butterfly of the family Hesperiidae. It is found in the Australian Capital Territory, New South Wales, Tasmania and Victoria.

The wingspan is about 30 mm.

The larvae feed on Carex species (including Carex appressa and Carex longebrachiata) and Scirpus polystachyus. They construct a shelter made by joining the leaves of its host plant with silk. It rests in this shelter during the day.

Subspecies
Oreisplanus munionga larana Couchman, 1962 (north-west coast of  Tasmania)
Oreisplanus munionga munionga (Olliff, 1890)  - alpine skipper (mountains of New South Wales and Victoria)

References

External links
Australian Insects

Trapezitinae
Butterflies described in 1890
Butterflies of Australia